Ronald Henry Lee (born November 2, 1952) is an American former basketball player who played six seasons in the National Basketball Association (NBA). He played college basketball for the University of Oregon, and epitomized the "Kamikaze Kids" under coach Dick Harter with his all-out, fearless hustle and relentless desire to win. Born in Boston, Massachusetts, Lee played four seasons for the Ducks between 1972 and 1976.  The Phoenix Suns made him the tenth selection in the NBA draft in 1976. Despite not playing football in high school and college, the NFL's San Diego Chargers also made him a 12th round selection in the 1976 NFL draft. In the NBA, Lee was named to the 1977 NBA All-Rookie Team and led the NBA in steals the following season.  Overall, Lee had a solid, but not spectacular career as a reserve, and became a fan favorite because of his effort on the court.

Ron Lee is still the all-time leading scorer for the University of Oregon with 2,085 points in his four seasons of play.  He ranks second in career assists with 572, first in field goals (838), and fifth in free throws made (409).  He was first-team All-Pac-8  in all four seasons with the Ducks, and made numerous All-American lists during his final three seasons. Lee was inducted into the Oregon Sports Hall of Fame in 1998.

After ending his NBA career, Lee played for 3 years in Italy.

Personal life
Ron is younger brother of Russ Lee, former All-American basketball player at Marshall University and sixth overall pick in the 1972 NBA draft. Ron has another brother who played basketball at Marshall named Eugene.  A third brother, Gerald Lee Sr., played at Dowling College and then professionally in Finland (all-time leading scorer in Finland pro basketball).  His nephew is the Finnish international player Gerald Lee.

See also
List of National Basketball Association players with most steals in a game

References

External links

1952 births
Living people
Alviks BK players
African-American basketball players
All-American college men's basketball players
American expatriate basketball people in Italy
American expatriate basketball people in Sweden
American men's basketball players
Atlanta Hawks players
Basketball players from Boston
Detroit Pistons players
New Orleans Jazz players
Oregon Ducks men's basketball players
Parade High School All-Americans (boys' basketball)
Phoenix Suns draft picks
Phoenix Suns players
Point guards
Victoria Libertas Pallacanestro players
21st-century African-American people
20th-century African-American sportspeople